Víctor Manuel Méndez Lanz (born 21 February 1952) is a Mexican politician affiliated with the Institutional Revolutionary Party. As of 2014 he served as Senator of the LVIII and LIX Legislatures of the Mexican Congress representing Campeche, as Deputy of the LX Legislature and as Municipal President of Campeche between 1997 and 2000.

See also
 List of presidents of Campeche Municipality

References

1952 births
Living people
Politicians from Campeche City
Members of the Senate of the Republic (Mexico)
Members of the Chamber of Deputies (Mexico)
Municipal presidents in Campeche
Institutional Revolutionary Party politicians
20th-century Mexican politicians
21st-century Mexican politicians
Monterrey Institute of Technology and Higher Education alumni
Florida International University alumni
Academic staff of Universidad Juárez del Estado de Durango
Academic staff of the Campeche Institute of Technology
Academic staff of the Autonomous University of Campeche